is Jyukai's debut single.

Release
It was released on March 15, 2006 under Sistus Records.

Anime tie-in
The title track was used as an ending theme for the anime series Fate/stay night.

Performance
Since the single peaked at #16, and sold 19,172 copies, this is considered Jyukai's most successful single to date.

Track listing 

 Anata ga Ita Mori
 SAKURA difference
 Anata ga Ita Mori (instrumental)
 SAKURA difference (instrumental)

References 

2006 singles
Japanese songs
2006 songs
Song recordings produced by Zentaro Watanabe